"Country Dreamer" is the B-side song to the single "Helen Wheels" released by Paul McCartney and Wings on 26 October 1973 in the UK and 12 November 1973 in the US. It was recorded in October 1972, and its country ambiance is similar to "Heart of the Country" from Paul McCartney's 1971 album Ram.

Release
The song was originally intended to be on Red Rose Speedway when it was to be a double album and was included on the 1993 The Paul McCartney Collection CD release of Band on the Run. It was also included on the 1987 CD reissue of Red Rose Speedway as well as the 2018 remastered version. As well as being included on those releases, it was put on the 2010 remastered version of Band on the Run, along with A-side "Helen Wheels".

Personnel

Paul McCartney - vocals, acoustic guitar, piano, percussion
Denny Laine - bass, backing vocals
Henry McCullough - slide guitar
Denny Seiwell - brushes, drums
Linda McCartney - backing vocals

Notes

1973 singles
Apple Records singles
Paul McCartney songs
Paul McCartney and Wings songs
Songs written by Paul McCartney
Songs written by Linda McCartney
Song recordings produced by Paul McCartney
Music published by MPL Music Publishing